The 1946 Rose Bowl was the 32nd edition of the college football bowl game,  played at the Rose Bowl in Pasadena, California, on Tuesday, January 1.

The game matched the undefeated Crimson Tide of the University of Alabama of the Southeastern Conference (SEC) and the #7 Trojans of the University of Southern California of the Pacific Coast Conference (PCC). The Tide defeated the underdog Trojans 34–14. It was Alabama’s sixth and final trip to the Rose Bowl until their College Football Playoff semifinal appearance in 2021 and Frank Thomas' final bowl trip as head coach.

Game summary
Alabama, known as the "wooden horse" led at the half 20–0 and the Trojans had a net loss of 24 yards. USC, which had won eight straight Rose Bowl games since 1923, didn't make a first down until the third quarter when the score was 27–0.

Alabama outgained USC 351 to 41 yards. Quarterback Harry Gilmer threw only eleven times in the game for one touchdown and ran for 116 yards on 16 carries. Hal Self scored twice, on a one-yard run and on a 24-yard Gilmer pass. Gilmer went over from the one, and Lowell Tew hit left guard from the two for points and Norwood Hodges scored up the middle on a one-yard plunge. Hugh Morrow kicked four extra points in the game.

Scoring

First quarter
Ala – Hal Self, 1-yard run (Hugh Morrow kick good)

Second quarter
Ala – Self, 1-yard run (Morrow kick good)
Ala – Lowell Tew, 5-yard run (Morrow kick missed)

Third quarter
Ala – Norwood Hodges, 1-yard run (Morrow kick good)

Fourth quarter
Ala – Harry Gilmer, 20-yard pass from Self (Morrow kick good)
USC – Harry Adelman, 26-yard pass from Verl Lillywhite (Joe Bowman kick good)
USC – Chick Clark returned a blocked kick (Lillywhite kick good)

Aftermath
Following this game, the PCC and Big Nine (now Pac-12 and Big Ten) entered into an exclusive five-year agreement for their champions to meet in the Rose Bowl. It has been extended numerous times, and outside of rotations in the playoffs, it continues. Both conferences openly admitted restricting the Rose Bowl, because they were tired of getting beaten by teams playing "hillbilly ball," the same reason they cited for not inviting them before 1920.

This was last Rose Bowl appearance by an SEC team for 72 years, when Georgia defeated Oklahoma in a national semifinal in early 2018. The first break in the Pac-12/Big Ten arrangement came in 2002, when it was the BCS Championship Game between Nebraska and Miami.

See also
 Dissatisfaction with distribution of tickets

References

1945–46 NCAA football bowl games
1946
1946
1946
1946 in sports in California
January 1946 sports events in the United States